Angel Miners & the Lightning Riders is the fourth studio album by American rock band Awolnation, and their first release since Here Come the Runts in 2018. It is also their first release under Better Noise Music. It was released on April 24, 2020.

Background 
While on tour with Twenty One Pilots in Fall of 2018, singer Aaron Bruno's home studio and much of his property were destroyed in the 2018 Woolsey Fire. This event, as well as a shooting in nearby Thousand Oaks that claimed the life of 12 people, inspired the lyrical content behind this album.  

On November 4, 2019, Awolnation released the first single from the album, "The Best", along with a music video for it. On November 29, they released the second single, called "California Halo Blue", a tribute song to the wildfires in southern California, plus a cover of "Drive", originally by the Cars. On February 4, 2020, the album was officially announced, with a release date of April 24, 2020. The third single "Mayday!!! Fiesta Fever", featuring Alex Ebert of the band Edward Sharpe and the Magnetic Zeros, was released on the same day. The fourth single "Slam (Angel Miners)" was released on March 13, 2020. 

In quarantine lockdown, the band reworked "The Best" featuring vocalist Alice Merton collaborating distantly. They released a second video for the song on March 27, 2020, showing the band playing together in a studio, with Merton singing in a different studio.

According to frontman Aaron Bruno, the album features songs "inspired by some of the most difficult events I have experienced. I'm excited for us all to enter this new world together & share these stories." After the album's release, the band will begin The Lightning Riders Tour with Andrew McMahon in the Wilderness and the Beaches.

Track listing

Personnel
Awolnation
 Aaron Bruno – vocals, guitars, synths, drums
 Isaac Carpenter – drums, percussion
 Zach Irons - guitars
 Dan Saslow - synths

Additional musicians
 Alex Ebert - vocals (track 3)
 Josh Moreau - bass (tracks 4, 6, 7, 9)
 Tracy Van Fleet - additional vocals (track 5)
 Callista Hoffman - additional vocals (track 5)
 Suzanne Waters - additional vocals (track 5)
 Elyse Willis - additional vocals (track 5)
 Rivers Cuomo - vocals (track 8)

Charts

References

2020 albums
Awolnation albums
Eleven Seven Label Group albums